The 2022 UCI Women's World Tour was a competition that included twenty-three road cycling events throughout the 2022 women's cycling season. It was the seventh edition of the UCI Women's World Tour, the ranking system launched by the Union Cycliste Internationale (UCI) in 2016. The competition began with Strade Bianche on 5 March, and finished with the final stage of the Tour de Romandie Féminin on 9 October.

Dutch rider Annemiek van Vleuten became the first rider to win the individual classification for a third time, having previously won the 2018 and 2021 titles. She won four overall victories during the season, including the Giro d'Italia Donne and the inaugural Tour de France Femmes - becoming the first woman to complete a Giro–Tour double in the same year.

Second place went to fellow Dutch rider Lorena Wiebes (Team DSM) who won three events. Third place was taken by Elisa Longo Borghini (Trek–Segafredo) for the second year in succession - Borghini won five events, including Paris–Roubaix Femmes. Twelve different riders won races, with five riders holding the individual classification lead during the season.

As in previous years, the teams classification was won by SD Worx - their sixth win in seven seasons. The youth classification was won by Dutch rider Shirin van Anrooij (Trek–Segafredo).

Events

The race calendar for the 2022 season was announced in June 2021, with twenty-four races initially scheduled – up from eighteen that were held in 2021. The calendar featured several new events, including Tour de France Femmes. In September 2021, the Tour de Romandie Féminin was added to make a total of twenty-five races. The two Chinese races were cancelled in June 2022, making a total of twenty-three races.

Cancelled events
Due to COVID-19-related logistical concerns raised by teams regarding travel to Australia (including strict quarantine requirements), the Cadel Evans Great Ocean Road Race was cancelled. In June 2022, the planned Chinese races (Tour of Chongming Island and Tour of Guangxi) were cancelled as the organisers did not wish to stage the events due to the COVID-19 pandemic in mainland China.

References

 
UCI
UCI
UCI Women's World Tour